This is the discography of the king of Death Rap Necro.

Studio albums

Compilations

Mixtapes

Rare Demos & Freestyles

Instrumental albums

With The Circle Of Tyrants

With Injustice

Singles

Productions

Guest appearances
 1999: "Wise Ass" (Greedy Fingers featuring Necro)
 1999: "Brutal Styles" (Greedy Fingers featuring Necro)
 1998: "I Shot Reagan" (Non Phixion featuring Necro)
 2002: "The Future Is Now" (Non Phixion featuring Necro)
 2002: "Necrosadistic" (Hecate sampling parts from Necro's "The Most Sadistic")
 2003: "Nothin" (Ill Bill featuring Necro)
 2003: "Street Villains Freestyle 3" (Ill Bill featuring Necro and Q-Unique)
 2003: "Street Villains Freestyle 4" (Ill Bill featuring Necro)
 2003: "Yall Don't Wanna" (Ill Bill, Necro, Kid Joe and Uncle Howie)
 2003: "Freestyle" (Q-Unique, Necro and Ill Bill)
 2003: "Freestyle" (Ill Bill and Necro)
 2003: "Dopesick" (Goretex featuring Necro)
 2003: "Reign in Blood" (Ill Bill featuring Necro)
 2003: "Street Veteran" (Mr. Hyde featuring Necro)
 2003: "White Slavery" (Ill Bill featuring Necro)
 2003: "Scumbags" (Goretex featuring Necro)
 2003: "Frank Zito" (Ill Bill featuring Necro)
 2003: "Our Life" (Ill Bill featuring Necro)
 2004: "Glenwood Projects" (Ill Bill featuring Goretex, Necro and Uncle Howie)
 2004: "Chasing the Dragon" (Ill Bill featuring Necro)
 2004: "Canarsie Artie's Brigade" (Ill Bill featuring Goretex, Necro and Q-Unique)
 2004: "89.9 Freestyle 1" (Non Phixion featuring Necro)
 2004: "Positive & Negative" (Sabac featuring Necro)
 2004: "P.O.W.'s" (Sabac featuring Goretex, Ill Bill, Mr. Hyde and Necro)
 2004: "The Crazies" (Mr. Hyde featuring Goretex, Ill Bill and Necro)
 2004: "Knife in Your Spine (Satanic Wordplay)" (Mr. Hyde featuring Necro)
 2004: "Street Veteran Part 2" (Mr. Hyde featuring Necro)
 2004: "Bums" (Mr. Hyde featuring Necro and Uncle Howie)
 2004: "Them" (Mr. Hyde featuring Necro, Ill Bill and Goretex)
 2004: "Canarsie Artie's Revenge" (Q-Unique featuring Goretex, Ill Bill and Necro)
 2004: "Achtung!! Baby!!" (Raptile featuring Necro)
 2004: "Blessed Are the Sick" (Goretex featuring Necro)
 2004: "Pigmartyr" (Goretex featuring Necro)
 2005: "Freestyle" (Ill Bill and Necro)
 2005: "Still Not a Player" (Remix) (Big Pun featuring Necro and Joe)
 2005: "Nasty Boy" (Remix) (Notorious B.I.G. featuring Necro)
 2005: "Freestyle" (Goretex and Necro)
 2005: "Freestyle" (Mr. Hyde and Necro)
 2006: "Do It" (Chopper Read featuring Necro)
 2007: "Take Em Home" (U-God featuring Necro)
 2007: "Mechanix" (Danny Diablo featuring Necro, Skinhead Rob and Prince Metropolitan)
 2008: "Fight Club"  (Violent J featuring Esham and Necro, Produced by Mike E. Clark)
 2008: "Braaains"  (Mr. Hyde featuring Necro) Produced by Necro
 2008: "Only Time Will Tell" (Ill Bill ft. Necro, Tech N9ne, and Everlast)
 2008: "Desperados"  (Riveria Regime featuring Necro and Danny Diablo, Produced by Necro)
 2009: "Fight Club"  (Violent J featuring Esham and Necro, Produced by Mike E. Clark)
 2012 "Play With Me"  (Gutta & Chris Carbene ft. Necro & Grim Moses)
 2012 "Can't Hold Me"  (Big Dave (rapper) ft. Necro and WC (rapper))
 2013 "Dead in the Streets"  (Psych Ward ft. Necro)

Filmography

DVDs

Music videos
 2000: "I Need Drugs" from I Need Drugs
 2003: "White Slavery" from Brutality Part 1
 2007: "The Pre-Fix for Death" from The Pre-Fix for Death (filmed in 2004, it was not released until 2007 where it was featured on a bonus DVD with Necro's fifth studio album)
 2007: "Mutilate the Beat" from Death Rap
 2008: "Who's Ya Daddy?" from The Sexorcist
 2008: "I Wanna Fuck" from The Sexorcist
 2009: "Human Trafficking" from Die!

Appearances in other artists' music videos
 1999: "14 Years Of Rap" from Skeme Team
 2002: "Rock Stars" from Non Phixion's The Future Is Now
 2004: "Chasing the Dragon" from Ill Bill's What's Wrong with Bill?
 2004: "A Change Gon' Come" from Sabac's A Change Gon' Come
 2007: "Mechanix" from Danny Diablo's Thugcore 4 Life
 2008: "Killer Collage" from Mr. Hyde's Chronicles Of The Beast Man

Directorial efforts

References 

Hip hop discographies
Discographies of American artists